Sunye Lake (also spelt Sont Ye Lake), also known as Sunye In, is a freshwater natural lake located near Kyaukse and Sintgaing, the large inland body of standing water measures approximately  and is known as "little Inle". 

The Shan Yoma Mountain Ranges sited at the east of the Lake. Sunye Lake is a tourist destination and famous for its blossoming lotus flowers in the rainy season and migratory birds in the cool season. The Lake designated as protected wetlands to conserve and regulate development. Sunye Lake is also a major source of lotus stems used in the production of lotus silk. Three major varieties of lotus are grown on the lake, namely padonma kya, blue lotus (ကြာပုတီး), and red lotus.

Sunye Lake has existed for generations and has a great history repair and maintenance by ancient kings.

References 

Lakes of Myanmar
Tourist attractions in Myanmar
Mandalay Region